Coosa Bald, with an elevation of , is tied with Double Spring Knob as the tenth-highest peak in Georgia. It is located in Union County and is the third-highest mountain in the county, behind Blood Mountain and Slaughter Mountain.  Coosa Bald is located in the Chattahoochee National Forest and its peak is crossed by the Duncan Ridge Trail, a trail that connects with the Benton MacKaye Trail and the Appalachian Trail.

References

External links 

TopoQuest map of Coosa Bald
100 highest peaks in Georgia
Georgia peaks over 4,000 feet

Mountains of Georgia (U.S. state)
Mountains of Union County, Georgia
Chattahoochee-Oconee National Forest